Cordon-bleu protein-like 1 is a protein that in humans is encoded by the COBLL1 gene.

References

External links

Further reading 

 
 
 
 
 

Cytoskeleton
Cell adhesion proteins